The Ejin Horo Banner, also known as Ejin Horo Qi or Yijinhuoluo County, is a banner in Ordos City in southwestern Inner Mongolia, China. It borders Shaanxi Province to the southeast.  As of 2009, the Ejin Horo Banner covers an area of almost , with a population of nearly 160,000, the majority of whom are ethnically Han Chinese.

China's growing economy has led, in recent years, to increased development in the area of the Ejin Horo Banner, with the construction or improvement of roads, transportation centers, and accommodation for travelers and tourists. It is the site of the Mausoleum of Genghis Khan, a AAAAA-rated tourist attraction that does not contain the body of Genghis Khan or, since the Cultural Revolution, any authentic artifacts from his life but which remains important as a cult site in Mongolian religion.

Name
The banner is named for the Mausoleum of Genghis Khan, whose Mongolian name Ejin Horo translates as "the Lord's Enclosure".

Geography 
The Ejin Horo Banner, as part of Ordos Prefecture, lies on a plateau in the southern portion of the Ordos Desert.  The land surface consists primarily of arid grassland or sandy dunes.  A tributary of the Yellow River flows through the banner.

Environmental issues 
Pasture degradation, soil erosion, and desertification were ongoing problems during the late 20th century. During the 1980s, the rate decreased substantially due to government programs and the availability of coal as a household fuel.

Climate

Economy 
The top industries are coal mining and extraction, mineral extraction, chemical engineering, sheep and goat herding, and cashmere production.  Total fossil fuel reserves beneath the Ejin Horo Banner are estimated to be about 27.8 billion tons, which includes coal and natural gas.  Although coal mining is of paramount importance to the regional economy, the poorly regulated industry has undermined parts of the area so badly that the ground surface has become unstable in places.  Because of the relentless coal extraction, parts of one village began caving in; the residents were re-located starting in 2008 to a planned community called Ulanmulun New Village, and has a capacity of 936 families.  Because of ground instability, coal mines producing less than 300,000 were shut down in 2000; those producing less than 600,000 tons annually were closed in 2007, drastically reducing the total number of mines in the area.

An industrial park that will focus on the manufacture of equipment for coal mining and fossil fuel extraction is under construction in the banner.  The total cost is expected to be around 10 billion yuan (US$1.46 billion), but is expected to produce 8,000 new jobs, and a potential 40,000 secondary jobs.

Mausoleum of Genghis Khan 

The Ejin Horo Banner is also known as the location of the Mausoleum of Genghis Khan.  Ethnic Mongolians in China have made pilgrimages to the mausoleum for decades, especially during the annual Naadam Festival every summer.  In recent years, there has been an increase in the number of tourists visiting the site, often wealthy urban Chinese on domestic excursions.  Local entrepreneurs are attempting to accommodate these visitors, and capitalize on the new situation; government subsidies reflect an attempt to stimulate the improvement of tourist facilities, which have held a AAAAA rating from China's National Tourism Administration since 2011. The mausoleum does not claim to contain the remains of Genghis Khan. A 17th-century source asserts that only the shirt, shoes, and tent of the great khan were buried at the Ejin Horo Banner, and even the few artifacts at the site were destroyed by Red Guards during the Cultural Revolution. There are other locations in Outer Mongolia that lay claim to the final resting place of Genghis Khan.

Near the official Mausoleum, there is a large, privately owned museum and park dedicated to Genghis Khan.  There is also a hotel and there are many tourist ger camps in the area, some of which have horses and offer short trail rides.

Transportation
Buses make regular stops in the Ejin Horo Banner when traveling along China National Highway 210.

Ordos Airport is in the area.

See also
 Tomb of Genghis Khan
 Altan Tobchi

Notes

References

External links 
 Official website 

Banners of Inner Mongolia
Genghis Khan
Ordos City